Tortoman is a commune in Constanța County, Northern Dobruja, Romania.

The commune includes two villages:
 Tortoman
 Dropia (historical names: Derinchioi)

The commune's name is of Turkish origin.

Demographics
At the 2011 census, Tortoman had 1,616 Romanians (99.88%), 2 others (0.12%).

References

Communes in Constanța County
Localities in Northern Dobruja
Place names of Turkish origin in Romania